Sanaz Marand and Melanie Oudin were the defending champions, but both players chose not to participate.

Monique Adamczak and Storm Sanders won the title, defeating Chang Kai-chen and Marina Erakovic in the final, 7–5, 6–4.

Seeds

Draw

External Links
Main Draw

Aegon Surbiton Trophy - Doubles
2017 Women's Doubles
Surbiton Trophy